Banavasi Madhukeshwara Temple  is an ancient Hindu temple dedicated to Shiva.

History
The Madhukeshwara Temple was built in the 9th century by Kannada's first kingdom Kadamba dynasty.

Gallery

References

External links

Hindu temples in Uttara Kannada district